Suberites dandelenae, the amorphous solid sponge, is a species of deep-sea demosponge from South Africa and Namibia.

Description 
This sponge is made up of rounded lobes. Each lobe has a distinct oscule on the top surface. It is yellow in colour and has a velvety surface. It breaks easily.

Spicules 
Several morphologically similar species occur, but they differ at the spicule level. The following spicules are present in this species:

 Three distinct size classes of tylostyles (spicule with a point at one end and a knob at the other).
 Centrotylostongyles/oxeas (needle-shaped spicules with a sharp point at either end).
 Tylostrongyles (spicules that have a swollen end).
 Microacanthostrongyle (small spine covered spicules that have a rounded end).

Distribution and habitat 
This species is found off the west coast of southern Africa. It is found on unconsolidated sediments such as sand.

Ecology 
This species grows in dense colonies. As much as 18 tons per square kilometer (6.95 tons per square mile) can be collected in a single demersal trawl off some areas of the South African coast. It is considered to be a potential indicator of a vulnerable marine ecosystem.

References 

Demospongiae
Animals described in 2017
Biodiversity of South Africa